Euchloe is a genus of pierid butterflies from the orangetip tribe (Anthocharini). They are Holarctic in distribution, with most species in Europe, Central Asia, and North America. Like other Anthocharini, the American species are usually called marbles; the Old World species are known as dappled whites.

Classification
Listed alphabetically within groups:
Subgenus Euchloe Hübner, 1819:
Euchloe ausonia (Hübner, [1803-1804]) – eastern dappled white
Euchloe ausonides (Lucas, 1852) – large marble or creamy marblewing
Euchloe belemia (Esper, 1800) – green-striped white
Euchloe crameri Butler, 1869 – western dappled white
Euchloe creusa (Doubleday, [1847]) – northern marble 
Euchloe daphalis (Moore, 1865)
Euchloe insularis (Staudinger, 1861)
Euchloe naina Kozhanchikov, 1923
Euchloe ogilvia Back, 1990
Euchloe orientalis (Bremer, 1864)
Euchloe pulverata (Christoph, 1884)
Euchloe simplonia (Bloisduval, 1828) – mountain dappled white
Euchloe tagis (Hübner, [1803-1804]) – Portuguese dappled white

Subgenus Elphinstonia Klots, 1930:
charlonia species group:
Euchloe bazae Fabiano, 1993
Euchloe charlonia (Donzel, 1842) – greenish black-tip or lemon white 
Euchloe lucilla Butler, 1886
Euchloe transcaspica (Staudinger, 1891)
Euchloe penia (Freyer, 1852)
 tomyris species group:
Euchloe lessei Bernardi, 1957
Euchloe tomyris Christoph, 1884
Euchloe ziayani Leestmans & Back, 2001

Incertae sedis:
Euchloe aegyptiaca Verity, 1911
Euchloe falloui (Allard, 1867) – scarce green-striped white
Euchloe guaymasensis Opler, 1986 – Sonoran marble
Euchloe hyantis (Edwards, 1871) (sometimes in E. creusa) – California marble or pearly marblewing 
Euchloe lotta Beutenmüller, 1898 (sometimes in E. creusa or E. hyantis) – desert marble 
Euchloe olympia (Edwards, 1871) – Olympia marble

References

External links
Euchloe images at  Consortium for the Barcode of Life

 
Anthocharini
Pieridae genera
Taxa named by Jacob Hübner